Club Real Santa Cruz is a football club from Santa Cruz, Bolivia currently playing in the top-flight División Profesional after winning promotion in 2019. The club last played in the first division in 2004; they also played the Copa Bolivia in 2001, when they became runners-up. They play their home games at the Estadio Real Santa Cruz.

History
The club was formed on 3 May 1962.

Achievements

National honours
Second Division, Copa Simón Bolívar:
Champions (1): 1993
Runners-up (1): 2019
Copa Bolivia:
Runners-up (1): 2001

References

External links
Bolivia – List of Final Tables 1950–1990 – RSSSF
Bolivia: Aparece acta en el que Real se fundó en 1960 – Fmbolivia.net 

Football clubs in Bolivia
1960 establishments in Bolivia
Association football clubs established in 1960
Sport in Santa Cruz de la Sierra